Riverside, Wisconsin may refer to the following places in Wisconsin:
Riverside, Burnett County, Wisconsin, an unincorporated community
Riverside, Lafayette County, Wisconsin, an unincorporated community